Lasse Antero Litma (born 5 April 1954 in Jyväskylä, Finland) is a retired professional ice hockey player who played in the SM-liiga.  He played for Tappara.  He was inducted into the Finnish Hockey Hall of Fame in 1994.

External links
 Finnish Hockey Hall of Fame bio

1954 births
Living people
Finnish ice hockey players
Ice hockey players at the 1980 Winter Olympics
Olympic ice hockey players of Finland
Sportspeople from Jyväskylä
Tappara players
20th-century Finnish people